Mehndi Laga Ke Rakhna is a popular 1995 Hindi song from Bollywood movie Dilwale Dulhania Le Jayenge sung by Lata Mangeshkar and Udit Narayan.

Composition 
The song which Shahrukh Khan is portrayed on-screen singing during the completion of Indian pre-wedding rituals in film, it is said to be one of India's best-known wedding and pre-wedding songs. This song was so popular that it played in the medley of Mujhse Dosti Karoge.

Credits 
Singer - Lata Mangeshkar, Udit Narayan

Lyricist - Anand Bakshi

Label -   Saregama India Ltd.

Director - Aditya Chopra

Music Label - YRF Music

Reception 

The song was picturised in a film sequence showing wedding celebration with film's cast. Even after two decades of its release, it remains one of the most popular songs played on Indian Wedding rituals mostly in North India.
It is song from one of the best selling soundtrack album.

Film/Documentary on Song 
A Bhojpuri Film titled same as of song was made. A documentary was released with director getting inspired from film and songs as well as all characters.

References 

1995 songs
Hindi film songs
Hindi-language songs
Bhojpuri cinema